LFO may refer to:
 Low-frequency oscillation, typically below 20 Hz

Arts, entertainment and media
 LFO (British band)
 "LFO", a song on the album Frequencies
 LFO (American band)
 LFO (album)
 LFO (film), 2013 Scandinavian sci-fi
 Little Fighter Online, a Windows game

Other uses
 London Festival Orchestra
 Lakeview – Fort Oglethorpe High School, Georgia, United States 
 LFO scandal, a political scandal in Poland 
 Legal Framework Order, 1970, Pakistan, a decree concerning elections